In mathematics, particularly in functional analysis, the Krein-Smulian theorem can refer to two theorems relating the closed convex hull and compactness in the weak topology. They are named after Mark Krein and Vitold Shmulyan, who published them in 1940.

Statement

Both of the following theorems are referred to as the Krein-Smulian Theorem.

See also

References

Bibliography

  
  
  
  
  

 
 
Topological vector spaces